Dacosta Boadu (born 21 October 1996) is a Ghanaian professional footballer who plays as a forward for Ghanaian Premier League side Ashanti Gold.

Career

Early career 
Boadu started his career with lower-tier side Galaxy United. In December 2016, he was signed by Sudanese club Al Khartoum under their then Ghanaian coach James Kwesi Appiah on a three-year deal to expire in 2019. After the expiration of his contract with the club he joined Oman second tier Salalah Sc for a season loan and after Ashanti gold Sc on a free transfer on March 20, 2020, and after playing 10 matches and scoring 5 after battling injuries throughout the season at the end of the season he decided to quit the club because of unpaid allowances by the club .

Ashanti Gold 
In Match 2020, he was signed by Obuasi-based team Ashanti Gold on a 2-year deal. On 13 December 2020, during his debut, he scored a brace in a 4–2 home win against Elmina Sharks to help the club to their first win of the season. He played the full 90 minutes was adjudged the man of the match at the end of the match and continue to win the player of the week 5 of the Gpl . He scored his 3rd goal of the season on 5 March 2021, he came off the bench in the 65th minute for Evans Obeng and scored in the 76th minute of the match to help secure a draw against International Allies.

References

External links 

 
 

Living people
1996 births
Association football forwards
Ghanaian footballers
Al Khartoum SC players
Medeama SC players
Ashanti Gold SC players
Ghana Premier League players
Ghanaian expatriate footballers
Ghanaian expatriate sportspeople in Sudan